Pinnipeds (from Latin pinna "wing or fin" and ped- "foot"), or fin-footed mammals, are a widely distributed and diverse group of semi-aquatic marine mammals. Seals, sea lions, and walruses are well-known examples of pinnipeds. In addition to inspiring the names for many sports teams (such as the three sports teams in the San Francisco, California area known as "the Seals"), pinnipeds have also inspired a number of fictional characters, creatures, and entities across human culture and media.

Seals and sea lions 
 In Icelandic folklore, the magical seal on whose back Sæmundur Sigfússon traveled from Europe to Iceland.
 Bobbie, a seal hostess of the second season of the Canadian adult animated television series Life's a Zoo
 Chip, a seal from Hello Kitty's Furry Tale Theater
 Fluke, Rudder and Gerald, sea lions from Finding Dory
 Flynn, an elephant seal in Ice Age 4: Continental Drift
 Pup, a seal from In Search of Santa
 Stefano, a sea lion in Madagascar 3: Europe's Most Wanted
 Havoc, also known as Lang in Japan, an anthropomorphic seal who is the main protagonist of the video game High Seas Havoc
 Hunter, a leopard seal in The Penguins of Madagascar
 Short Fuse, a harp seal in the Penguins of Madagascar
 Sophie, a circus seal whom Dr. Dolittle befriends and helps escape back to the ocean, in Doctor Dolittle's Circus and also in Dr. Dolittle
 Lou Seal: mascot for the San Francisco Giants
 Kotick: the main character in Rudyard Kipling's short story The White Seal, later made into a cartoon by Chuck Jones
 Salty, a seal that appears in the Disney cartoons Pluto's Playmate and Mickey and the Seal and later in Mickey's Mouseworks, House of Mouse and Mickey Mouse Clubhouse
 The title character of Andre
 Skæg, a seal sea captain in the Danish comics series Rasmus Klump.
 Slappy the sea lion from the film Slappy and the Stinkers
 Sully, a sea lion from Danger Rangers
 Thornton, a harbor seal from Shark Bait
 Whiskers from Manta and Moray
 Esmeralda the sea lion from the Disney version of 20,000 Leagues Under the Sea
 The San-X company characters Mamegoma
 The main characters of Romeo & Juliet: Sealed with a Kiss
 Sandy, an orphaned seal from the film Sandy the Seal
 Sparky, an escaped seal in the episode "Love and Sandy" from the 1964 television series Flipper
 Wolfgang the Seal, former character from Sesame Street
 At the end of the fantasy novel Kitty and the Midnight Hour, there is a mention of Homo sapiens pinnipedia at the end; a wereseal. This mention is expanded upon in Kitty's House of Horrors, where the heroine meets a were-seal, Alaskan state legislator Lee.
 Robby, friend of Pingu.
 Robby, a friend of Lars from The Little Polar Bear
 The titular character of Seabert who is a whitecoat seal
 Smaxey, the former seal mascot of Kellogg's Sugar Smacks.
 Sneezly, Hanna Barbera's sneezing seal from Breezly and Sneezly.

Walruses 
 The Walrus from Lewis Carroll's poem "The Walrus and the Carpenter"
 Capn' Cragg, a walrus from In Search of Santa
 Chumley, the walrus sidekick to Tennessee Tuxedo (the Penguin) 
 Coach Whistler, a walrus who lives in the Land of Play in Jim Henson's Pajanimals
 Dash, a walrus from The Little Mermaid II: Return to the Sea
 Hercule Moustache, a grumpy walrus with a French accent, live in Mossy Bay in 64 Zoo Lane
 Jim McSweeney from the second issue of The Adventures of Sly Cooper
The Sea Vitch, a rude walrus in Rudyard Kipling's short story The White Seal
Thrasher, a walrus in Tappy Toes
 Wally Walrus
 Rotor Walrus, a technician walrus from Sonic the Hedgehog (Archie Comics)
Whoopie the walrus in Rocket: Robot on Wheels
 Winthrop, a walrus in Piper Penguin and His Fantastic Flying Machines
 Kapitein Wal Rus, a sea captain in Tom Poes.
 Captain Thames in Xenogears
 The cruel walruses in the movie adaptation of The Jungle Bunch, a Canadian-American children's show
 Wozza, a walrus who lives in a cave in Freezeezy Peak in Banjo-Kazooie
 A walrus named Rusty Walrus who appeared in Crash Twinsanity during the level of High Seas Hi-Jinks, who chases Crash which he calls fresh meat for his pot.

References 

Pinnipeds